Kalinina is a rural locality (a settlement) in Eltonskoye Rural Settlement, Pallasovsky District, Volgograd Oblast, Russia. The population was 179 as of 2010. There are 2 streets.

Geography 
Kalinina is located 121 km south of Pallasovka (the district's administrative centre) by road. Elton is the nearest rural locality.

References 

Rural localities in Pallasovsky District